Punam Anand Keller is the Charles Henry Jones Third Century Professor of Management at Tuck School of Business, Dartmouth College.

In 2018, she was named a fellow of the Association for Consumer Research.

References

Year of birth missing (living people)
Living people
Dartmouth College faculty
American economists
American women economists
Northwestern University alumni
21st-century American women